Nachman HaKohen Krochmal (born in Brody, Galicia, on 17 February 1785; died at Ternopil on 31 July 1840) was a Jewish Galician philosopher, theologian, and historian.

Biography
He began the study of the Talmud at an early age. At age fourteen he was married, according to the custom of the time, to the daughter of the wealthy merchant Habermann. He then went to live with his father-in-law at Zhovkva, near Lemberg, where he devoted himself entirely to his studies, beginning with Maimonides' The Guide for the Perplexed, and studying other Hebrew philosophical writings.

Krochmal then proceeded to study German and the German philosophers, especially Immanuel Kant, to read Latin and French classics, and Arabic and Syriac books. After suffering a breakdown from overwork in 1808, he went to Lemberg for medical treatment; and the friendship he there formed with S.L. Rapoport, whose teacher he became, was most fruitful for "Jewish science" Wissenschaft des Judentums). On his return to Żółkiew, after having partially recovered, he again took up philosophy, reading Kant, Johann Gottlieb Fichte, and Friedrich Wilhelm Joseph von Schelling, and subsequently Georg Wilhelm Friedrich Hegel, whose system chiefly attracted him and exerted a great influence on his views. Aside from Rapoport, who often visited him in Żółkiew, he gathered around him a group of young students.

In 1814, after the death of his wife's parents, he was compelled to earn a livelihood, and he became a merchant. Twelve years later he lost his wife, and his health became very poor. In spite of failure in business, poor circumstances, and loneliness, he refused an invitation to the rabbinate of Berlin, and instead obtained a position as bookkeeper in Żółkiew, which he held from 1836 to 1838. A serious illness then compelled him to retire to his daughter's house in Tarnopol; and here two years later he died.

Career
Krochmal was a brilliant conversationalist and an exceedingly careful student. For a long time he could not be persuaded to publish any of the results of his studies, in consequence of aspersions cast upon him on account of his friendly correspondence with the hakham of the neighboring Karaite community of Kokusow. Krochmal defended himself in a circular letter against these accusations.

He was not a prolific writer. Besides some Hebrew essays in periodicals (Sulamith, 1818; Ha-Ẓefirah, Zolkiev, 1824; and Kerem Ḥemed, vols. iv., v.), he wrote only one Hebrew book, namely, Moreh Nebuke ha-Zeman (Lemberg, 1851), edited, according to the author's last will, by Leopold Zunz, whom he admired as a great scholar though he never met. Other editions appeared in Lemberg in 1863 and Warsaw in 1898. The final, now-standard version of the text was established by Simon Rawidowicz in 1924. All later printings are facsimiles of the Rawidowicz edition.

Moreh Nebukhe ha-Zeman
Moreh Nebukhe ha-Zeman (Guide for the Perplexed of the Time) is divided into seventeen chapters, of which the first six deal with religion in general.

Ch. vii describes Israel's spiritual gift as the desire for and faculty of seeking God. The next three chapters contain a philosophical analysis of Jewish history, which, corresponding to Israel's attachment to the Lord, that is, to its religious development, is divided into three epochs. These epochs terminate respectively: (1) with the death of Gedaliah after the destruction of the Temple; (2) with the death of Bar Kokba (ca. 135); and (3) with the expulsion of the Jews from Spain (1492). The author does not characterize the modern period in which he himself lived.

Ch. xi-xv deal with the post-exilic Biblical and the Apocryphal literature and with the various religious movements. The author discusses also the necessity of tradition and gives a critical résumé of the development of the Halakhah and Aggadah.

Ch. xvi gives a brief sketch of the future development of Jewish religious philosophy based on the principles of Hegel. The work finishes with an exposition of Ibn Ezra's philosophy. The historical digressions in the book touch the profoundest problems of Jewish science; and it remains their indisputable merit to have paved the way for critical studies in Jewish history. The work really became, as intended by the author, a "guide" to students of Jewish science in the nineteenth century.

References

External links
 Moreh Nebuke ha-Zeman from Google Books (pages scanned in reverse order)
 Moreh Nebukhe ha-Zeman study in English from Google Books
 More Nebukhe ha-Zeman (Hebrew), introduction and academic editor: Yehoyada Amir, Jerusalem: Carmel Publishing House, 2010.
 Yehoyada Amir, “The Perplexity of our Time: Nachman Krochmal and Modern Jewish Existence”, Modern Judaism, 23, 3 (October 2003), 264-301.

1785 births
1840 deaths
People from Brody
Austrian philosophers
Jewish philosophers
Philosophers of Judaism
19th-century Jewish theologians
Jews from Galicia (Eastern Europe)
Ukrainian Jews
Kohanim writers of Rabbinic literature
People of the Haskalah